Olšovice is a municipality and village in Prachatice District in the South Bohemian Region of the Czech Republic. It has about 60 inhabitants.

Administrative parts
The hamlet of Hláska is an administrative part of Olšovice.

References

Villages in Prachatice District